The Patriotas de Venezuela baseball club was a founding member of the Venezuelan Professional Baseball League in its inaugural season of 1946.

Team history
The Patriotas, based in Caracas, played its home games at the now-extinct Estadio Cerveza Caracas, while appearing in nine seasons spanning 1946–1955. The team was also nicknamed the Criollos for a while.

The VPBL opening game was realized on January 12, 1946. Besides Venezuela, the circuit included the Cervecería Caracas, Navegantes del Magallanes, and Sabios de Vargas teams.

The Patriotas were owned and established by Juan Antonio Yanes, one of the early pioneers of professional baseball in the country, who also managed his team in parts of two seasons. In addition, both Paul Richards, Eddie Popowski and Junior Thompson will manage the team at some point.

Venezuela did not have a particularly good record with 162 wins and 228 losses during its stint in the league, and never had a winning season or made the playoffs. Nevertheless, it was a team that never lacked spirit, determination and hustle, gamely battling against their strongest rivals down to the final of each game.

The Patriotas were out during the 1953-54 season due to economic issues. They reappeared in 1954-55, but folded at the end of the season. Following a change of ownership, the new owners renamed the franchise as the Licoreros de Pampero starting the 1955-56 season.

Yearly Team Records

Team highlights
1946-47: Parnell Woods, champion bat with a .354 average.
1947-48: Luke Easter, league leader with eight home runs.
1948-49: Roy Welmaker, most strikeouts by a pitcher with 102.
1949-50: Santiago Ullrich, Triple crown pitching winner with eight wins, 59 strikeouts and a 2.74 ERA.
1950-51: René González, league leader with 50 runs batted in, while tying with Vargas' Frank Mancuso for the most homers with 10.
1952-53: Hank Schenz, champion bat with a .355 average.
1954-55: Harold Bevan, champion bat with a .350 average.

Other noted players

Red Adams
Luis Aloma
Carlos Ascanio
Eddie Basinski
Don Buddin
Daniel Canónico
Ed Chandler
Lorenzo Davis
Wilmer Fields
Ben Flowers
Joe Frazier
Russ Kerns
Julián Ladera
Red Lynn
Pete Milne
Mickey Owen
Al Papai
Roy Partlow
Dave Pope
Saul Rogovin
Luis Romero Petit
Bob Smith
Gene Stephens
Max Surkont
George Susce
Bill Webb
Dewey Williams
José Zardón

Sources
 Gutiérrez, Daniel; Alvarez, Efraim; Gutiérrez (h), Daniel (2006). La Enciclopedia del Béisbol en Venezuela. LVBP, Caracas. 
 Gutiérrez, Daniel; González, Javier (1992). Numeritos del béisbol profesional venezolano (1946-1992). LVBP, Caracas.

External links
Meridiano.com – Historia de la Liga Venezolana de Béisbol Profesional (Spanish)
PuraPelota.com – Patriotas de Venezuela (1946 – 1952-53)
PuraPelota.com – Patriotas de Venezuela (1954-55)
es.Wikipedia.org – Liga Venezolana de Béisbol Profesional
es.Wikipedia.org – Patriotas de Venezuela

1946 establishments in Venezuela
Sport in Caracas
Defunct baseball teams in Venezuela
Baseball teams established in 1946